Open is Blues Image's second album and most acclaimed album, which featured the No. 4 hit single, "Ride Captain Ride".

Critical reception 
Robert Christgau, writing in The Village Voice, wrote in a contemporary review: "Great single, mediocre (though improved) album. Do we really need another 'Parchman Farm?'"

Track listing
All songs composed and arranged by Blues Image; except where noted.

"Love Is the Answer" – 2:35
"Running the Water" – 2:37
"Clean Love" – 7:49
"La Bamba" (Traditional; arranged by Blues Image) – 2:26
"Consuelate" – 1:15
"Ride Captain Ride" – 3:46
"Pay My Dues" – 3:49
"Fugue U" – 0:50
"Parchman Farm" (Mose Allison) – 2:49
"Wrath of Daisey" – 1:31
"Take Me" – 7:35

Personnel
Blues Image
Mike Pinera – lead guitar, lead vocals
Skip Konte – keyboards
Malcolm Jones – bass
Manny Bertematti – drums
Joe Lala – percussion, backing vocals

Additional personnel
Kent Henry – guitars

References

External links
 

1970 albums
Blues Image albums
Albums produced by Richard Podolor
Atco Records albums